

Platt may refer to:

Places 

 Platt, Austria
 Platt, Florida, an unincorporated community in DeSoto County, Florida, United States
 Platt, Kent, England

People 

 Platt (surname)
 Platt baronets, two baronetcies of the United Kingdom

Other uses 

 Leggett & Platt, manufacturing company
 Low German, in German known as "Plattdeutsch", "Plattdüütsch", "Platt"
 Platt Amendment, a 1901 U.S. law pertaining to Cuba-U.S. relations
 Platt Brothers, manufacturers of textile machinery in Oldham, England 
 Platt Fields Park, a park in Fallowfield, Manchester, England
 Platt Island, an archaeological site near Miles City, Florida
 Platt-LePage Aircraft Company, an American aircraft company
 Platt Music, an American music retailer
 Platt National Park, which became part of Chickasaw National Recreation Area
 Platt Technical High School
 The Platt Building, a historic building in downtown Los Angeles
 Platt (genus), a genus of digenetic trematodes in the family Spirorchiidae

See also
 Plat (disambiguation) 
 Plat, in the United States, is a map, drawn to scale, showing the divisions of a piece of land
 Platte (disambiguation)
 Platts (disambiguation)
 Plait (disambiguation)